Dipotassium cyclooctatetraenide, sometimes abbreviated K2COT, is an organopotassium compound with the formula K2C8H8.  It is a brown solid that is used as a precursor to cyclooctatetraenide complexes, such as uranocene (U(C8H8)2).  Analogs of K2C8H8 are known with ring substituents, with different alkali metals, and with various complexants.

Preparation and structure
Potassium cyclooctatetraenide is formed by the reaction of cyclooctatetraene with potassium metal:
2 K  +  C8H8   →    K2C8H8
The reaction entails 2-electron reduction of the polyene and is accompanied by a color change from colorless to brown.

The structure of K2(diglyme)C8H8 has been characterized by X-ray crystallography of the derivatives with diglyme complexed to the potassium cations.   The C8H8 unit is planar  with an average C-C distance of 1.40 A.

References

Potassium compounds
Non-benzenoid aromatic carbocycles